David "Gentleman Dave" Julius Malarcher (October 18, 1894 – May 11, 1982) was an American third baseman in Negro league baseball. He played for the Indianapolis ABCs, Detroit Stars, and Chicago American Giants from 1916 to 1934.

Malarcher won three pennants as manager, one of eight managers to ever do so in Negro league baseball.

Background
In his own words, captured in documentary, Malarcher's mother was born in slavery. His father was the head workman on a big plantation. He was the youngest of 11 children, and grew up in Union, Louisiana. He started playing baseball at a very young age, and had older brothers also playing baseball, his oldest brother playing on the men's team.

Playing career
Malarcher was attending New Orleans University and playing for the New Orleans Eagles at the age of 22 in 1916 when he was picked up by the Indianapolis ABCs who were traveling back from the winter baseball league in Cuba. The ABCs offered him $50 a month for his first contract.

In 1917, at the age of 22, Malarcher registered for the World War I draft. He listed his current address as 446 Indiana Avenue in Indianapolis, Indiana; the listing stated his current employment as a ball player and employed by C.I. Taylor with his mother as a dependent.

Malarcher was drafted in 1918 and served for the 369th Infantry Regiment where it was stated that the regiment was denied a combat role under the U.S. flag, so the regiment served under the French flag. The regiment returned to a parade down Lenox Avenue in Harlem, New York.

After the war, Malarcher went to work for Rube Foster, playing for the Detroit Stars, and then the Chicago American Giants.

He managed Chicago for seven seasons (two fragmented), winning the Negro World Series twice while winning a Negro Southern League pennant. Six managers beside him won three pennants, but only Vic Harris won more. He was the first of only two managers to lead a team to the series title twice, with the only other manager being Candy Jim Taylor nearly two decades later.

References

"New Orleans University Produces Baseball Great" www.dillard.edu Story by Ryan Whirty
Negro League Baseball Museum

External links
 and Baseball-Reference Black Baseball stats and Seamheads
  and Seamheads

1894 births
1982 deaths
People from St. James Parish, Louisiana
Negro league baseball managers
Indianapolis ABCs players
Detroit Stars players
Chicago American Giants players
Baseball players from Louisiana
20th-century African-American sportspeople
Baseball infielders
American military personnel of World War I